Najma Shaheen (born 9 February 1962) is a Pakistani politician who has been a Member of the Provincial Assembly of Khyber Pakhtunkhwa, since May 2013.

Early life and education
Shaheen was born on 9 February 1962 in Kohat, Khyber Pakhtunkhwa.

She has completed intermediate education.

Political career

Shaheen was elected to the Provincial Assembly of Khyber Pakhtunkhwa as a candidate of Jamiat Ulema-e Islam (F) on a reserved seat for women in 2013 Pakistani general election.

In May 2016, she joined a resolution to establish a Women's Caucus in the Provincial Assembly of Khyber Pakhtunkhwa. She also joined a resolution to declare 8 July as Charity Day in honour of Abdul Sattar Edhi. In December, she joined a resolution to establish a minority Caucus in the Provincial Assembly of Khyber Pakhtunkhwa.

References

Living people
Jamiat Ulema-e-Islam (F) politicians
1962 births